Saint Procopius may refer to:

People
 Procopius of Scythopolis (died 303), Christian martyr and saint 
 Procopius of Sázava (died 1053), Bohemian canon and hermit
 Procopius of Ustyug (1243?—1303),  fool for Christ (yurodivy), miracle worker and Russian Orthodox Church saint

Churches
 St. Procopius Basilica in Třebíč, Czech Republic
 Saint Procopius Church of Tirana, Albania
 St. Procopius Church, Žďár nad Sázavou, Czech Republic

Other uses
 St. Procopius College, original name of Benedictine University, Lisle, Illinois, United States
 St. Procopius Abbey, Chicago, Illinois, whose monks founded the college